The culture of Aruba, one of the many islands that make up the Caribbean, is an amalgamate of the various cultures that have occupied and lived on the island, including indigenous peoples of South America, descendants of African slaves, and Spanish and Dutch colonialists.

Indigenous culture
Aruba was inhabited long before it was claimed by the Spanish in 1499, as evidenced by petrographs on walls and the ceilings of caves and excavated ancient artifacts of the Arawaks. They indicate that the Caiquetios, peoples of the Arawak tribe that migrated north from the Orinoco Basin in South America, were in fact the very first inhabitants of the island.

Foreign presence
Although the Spanish were in control of Aruba for many years, the Eighty Years' War between Spain and the Netherlands soon gave the Dutch the upper hand. Finally, in 1636 the Spanish handed over the island to the Dutch. Years later, the English took over Aruba for a brief period, but it quickly returned to Dutch rule in 1816 and remained that way until 1985, when Aruba became a separate entity within the kingdom of the Netherlands.

People
The people and culture of Aruba have many different backgrounds, ranging from the Native Arubans, to the Spanish, and more recently, the Dutch. Today, Aruba is home to people from at least 40 different nationalities.

Nowadays, the nearly 100,000 inhabitants of Aruba reflect its greatly changing history. Through local foods, architecture, celebrations, and languages can immediately be seen the different influences the past settlers had on the island. The Dutch continue to be the most influential people in Aruban society, as the Dutch language is one of the official tongues of the Aruban people and Aruba continues to have close ties to the Netherlands.

Cultural celebrations
Aruba has its own distinct culture, which often includes celebrations. Color and music play an important role in the majority of cultural events, most notably in the yearly Carnival and Dia Di San Juan (St. John's Day) celebrations.

For Dia Di San Juan, Arubans dress in red and yellow traditional shirts and black traditional trousers to represent fire. This celebration originates from a combination of pre-Christian Arawak harvest festivals and the works of Spanish missionaries to combine them with the celebration of San Juan. Aruba is the only country in the world that celebrates this day with dancing and singing. During the celebration a singer will chant a familiar "dera gai" (bury rooster) tune while players accompany the song with drum, violin, and a local instrument called a wiri. While they sing, they will choose someone to come and try to hit a fake rooster with their eyes closed. When that person hits that rooster, it will bring a wonderful smell that comes from the fruit (calabash).

Arubans often refer to Carnival as Bacchanal, a term based on the Greek and Roman celebrations dedicated to Dionysus for the Greeks and Bacchus for the Romans, their god of wine, vegetation, and cheer. Aruba's Bacchanalia shares some similarities with the ancient celebrations.

The New Year celebration in Aruba also includes a number of cultural superstitions and traditions; the traditional celebration is called dande. The name dande, also spelled dandee, comes from the Papiamento word dandara, meaning "to revel, to carouse, or to have a good time". After King William III of the Netherlands declared slaves to be free, the celebration began.

A group of five or six people usually performs these rituals, though more can join in. These people accompany a singer and travel door-to-door to express their best wishes for the New Year in repetitive songs, with a chorus that includes the phrase "ai nobe" (aña nobo) – "new year" – sung after each phrase. The celebratory travel usually leads to the houses of the singers' friends and family, where the host collects money in his hat to give to the group. Certain districts may have their own dande groups performing on the second day of the year.

Superstition and pagan beliefs
Influenced by American tourists and the Latin Americans working in Aruba, Halloween is now a yearly occurrence. Not to be confused with the Latin-American holiday: Dia de Los Muertos which has no relation to the westernized Halloween. The first beliefs and superstitions in Aruba date from Pre-Columbian times, when Indians roamed on Aruba. After 1820, with the disappearance of the Indians, their imagery and cultural heritage were lost. With the influx of slaves during the seventeenth and eighteenth centuries, African beliefs and superstitions were assimilated, some of which are evident in the traditions of Dera Gai, Dande, and harvest feasts.

Film
Aruba does not have a native film industry; the 2013 film Abo So was the first indigenous feature. It features the music of Padú del Caribe.

References

External links

 Aruba - Official site for Government of Aruba